The Obiekt 785, or Object 785 (Объект 785), was a Soviet experimental main battle tank built in the late 1970s. It was an improved variant of the T-80B, with seven road wheels.

The tank was testing the new generation 125 mm 2A82 smoothbore gun, carrying 50 rounds of ammunition, 30 of which in the loading mechanism. It was also testing a 130 mm rifled gun, an improved variant of the M-65 gun used on tanks like Object 279.

See also
 M1 Abrams - Component Advanced Technology Test Bed (CATTB)
 Leopard 2-140
 Pz 87-140
 Object 292
 Object 195
 Type 99KM

References

Main battle tanks of the Soviet Union
Cold War tanks of the Soviet Union
Abandoned military projects of the Soviet Union
Main battle tanks of the Cold War
Trial and research tanks of the Soviet Union